Christianity is the most widely professed religion in Croatia and a large majority of the Croatian population declare themselves to be members of the Catholic Church. 

Croatia has no official religion and freedom of religion is a right defined by the Constitution of Croatia, which also defines all religious communities as equal in front of the law and separate from the state.

History
In the 16th century, Protestantism reached Croatia, but was mostly eradicated due to the Counter-Reformation implemented by the Habsburgs.

There is also significant history of the Jews in Croatia through the Holocaust. The history of the Jews in Croatia dates back to at least the 3rd century, although little is known of the community until the 10th and 15th centuries. By the outbreak of World War II, the community numbered approximately 20,000 members, most of whom were murdered during the Holocaust that took place on the territory of the Nazi puppet state called Independent State of Croatia. After World War II, half of the survivors chose to settle in Israel, while an estimated 2,500 members continued to live in Croatia. According to the 2011 census, there were 509 Jews living in Croatia, but that number is believed to exclude those born of mixed marriages or those married to non-Jews. More than 80 percent of the Zagreb Jewish community were thought to fall in those two categories.

Demographics
According to the 2011 census 86.28% of Croatians are Catholics, while Orthodox Christians make up 4.44% of the population, Muslims 1.47%, and Protestants 0.34% of the population. 3.81% of Croatians are not religious and atheists, 0.76% are agnostics and sceptics, and 2.17% are undeclared. In the Eurostat Eurobarometer Poll of 2005, 67% of the population of Croatia responded that "they believe there is a God". In a 2009 Gallup poll, 70% answered yes to the question "Is religion an important part of your daily life?". However, only 24% of the population attends religious services regularly.

Interaction between religious and secular Life

Public schools allow religious teaching in cooperation with religious communities having agreements with the state, but attendance is not mandated. Religion classes are organized widely in public elementary and secondary schools, most commonly coordinated with the Catholic Church.

The public holidays in Croatia also include the religious festivals of Epiphany, Easter Monday, Corpus Christi Day, Assumption Day, All Saints' Day, Christmas, and St. Stephen's or Boxing Day. The primary holidays are based on the Catholic liturgical year, but other believers are legally allowed to celebrate other major religious holidays.

Marriages conducted by the religious communities having agreements with the state are officially recognized, eliminating the need to register the marriages in the civil registry office.

The Catholic Church in Croatia receives state financial support and other benefits established in concordats between the Government and the Vatican. The concordats and other government agreements with non-Catholic religious communities allow state financing for some salaries and pensions for religious officials through government-managed pension and health funds.

The concordats and agreements also regulate public school catechisms and military chaplains.

In line with the concordats signed with the Roman Catholic Church and in an effort to further define their rights and privileges within a legal framework, the government has additional agreements with the following 14 religious and Faith communities:
 Serbian Orthodox Church (SPC)
 Islamic Community of Croatia
 Evangelical Church in the Republic of Croatia
 Reformed Christian Church in Croatia
 Protestant Reformed Christian Church in Croatia
 Pentecostal Church
 Union of Pentecostal Churches of Christ
 Seventh-day Adventist Church
 Union of Baptist Churches
 Church of God
 Church of Christ
 Reformed Movement of Seventh-day Adventists
 Bulgarian Orthodox Church (BPC)
 Macedonian Orthodox Church (MPC–OA)
 Old Catholic Church of Croatia

Legal status

The 2002 Law on the Legal Position of Religious Communities broadly defines religious and Faith communities' legal positions and covers such matters as government funding, tax benefits, and religious education in schools. Matters such as pensions for clergy; religious service in the military, penitentiaries, and police; and recognition of religious and Faith marriages are left to each religious and Faith community to negotiate separately with the Government.

Registration of religious groups is not obligatory; however, registered groups are granted "legal person" status and enjoy tax and other benefits. The law stipulates that to be eligible for registration, a religious group must have at least 500 believers and be registered as an association for 5 years. All religious and Faith groups in the country prior to passage of the law in 2002 were registered without having to meet these conditions; religious and Faith groups new to the country after passage of the law must fulfill the requirements for the minimum number of believers and time as an association. Religious and Faith groups based abroad must submit written permission for registration from their country of origin. Minister of Public Administration runs a Registry of religious organizations in Republic of Croatia, currently recognizing 62 religious communities.

See also

 Catholic Church in Croatia
 Eastern Orthodoxy in Croatia
 Protestantism in Croatia
 Church of Jesus Christ of Latter-day Saints in Croatia
 Islam in Croatia
 History of the Jews in Croatia
 Buddhism in Croatia
 Hinduism in Croatia
 Irreligion in Croatia

References

External links

 Registry of Religious Communities, Ministry of Public Administration, Government of the Republic of Croatia